Georgiana Rose Simpson (1865–1944) was a philologist and the first African-American woman to receive a PhD in the United States. Simpson received her doctoral degree in German from the University of Chicago in 1921.

Early life and education 
Simpson was born in Washington, D.C. on 31 Mar 1865, eldest daughter of David and Catherine Simpson, where she attended public school. She later received training to teach in city elementary schools at Miner Normal School in Washington, D.C., and started teaching in 1885. During this time, she taught within German immigrant communities. She was encouraged to continue learning and to formally study German in college by one of her former teachers, Dr. Lucy E. Moten.

Simpson enrolled at the University of Chicago in 1907, and received a bachelor of arts degree in German in 1911. To avoid the pervasive racism on campus, she finished her studies mainly through summer and correspondence courses. She completed her master's degree with her thesis, The Phonology of Merigarto which examined an early Middle High German poem. Simpson was also teaching at Dunbar High School (Washington, D.C.) during her post-graduate years. At age 55, she completed her dissertation, Herder's Conception of "Das Volk", and received her PhD in German on June 14, 1921.

Experience and contributions during segregation 

Simpson and her achievements have been discussed in the context of the civil rights movement during segregation. She experienced racial prejudice very early on in her enrollment at the University of Chicago, particularly in housing; that she was invited to reside in the women's dormitory was met with protest from white students.  She was initially asked to leave the women's dormitory by Sophonisba Breckinridge, who headed the residence hall, but Simpson refused. Breckinridge reversed her decision so that Simpson could remain, but she was overruled by university president Harry Pratt Judson, who asked Simpson to leave, to which she complied.  Consequently, Simpson took her courses during the summer to avoid further racially motivated conflicts with the predominantly white, southern student body. Furthermore, a letter from the Frederick Douglass Centre was sent to President Judson condemning their action to remove Simpson:

Simpson was the first black woman to be awarded a doctoral degree in the United States. After receiving her PhD, she along with black scholars Sadie Tanner Mossell, Eva B. Dykes, and Anna Julia Cooper who also received doctoral degrees around the same time, were "... not immediately improved by their accomplishments" due to discrimination.    In the case of Simpson, she returned to Dunbar High School in Washington, D.C. to teach as most universities did not hire black women outside of home economics courses at this time.
Simpson also wrote a letter to W.E.B. Dubois in 1936 inquiring about an encyclopedic project and how she may contribute an article on the "Negro dialect" or on the "philosophy of Negro folk literature."  Her final major publication was a translation of a French work, detailing the biography of Toussaint L'Ouverture, the leader of the Haitian Revolution.

In 2017, the Monumental Women Project, co-founded by Asya Akca and Shae Omonijo, honored Simpson by commissioning a bust of her in the Reynolds Club at the University of Chicago, which was placed directly across from a relief that honors President Judson.

Footnotes

References 

American philologists
African-American women writers
African-American writers
American writers
1866 births
1944 deaths
People from Washington, D.C.
University of Chicago alumni
French–English translators
20th-century African-American people
20th-century African-American women